Hydrocortisone/miconazole is a combination drug, often consisting of 1% hydrocortisone (a class I topical steroid) with 2% miconazole (a broad spectrum antifungal). This combination drug is sold as Daktacort in UK, Daktodor in Greece and Cortimyc in Sweden. In Denmark it is available as Brentacort.

Indications include irritant diaper dermatitis.

References 

Combination drugs